YSR Bima is an insurance policy launched by Government of Andhra Pradesh to provide relief for the families of unorganized workers of below poverty line.

Development 
The scheme was launched by Chief minister of Andhra Pradesh Y. S. Jagan Mohan Reddy in association with the central government scheme Pradhan Mantri Suraksha Bima Yojana. The Government of Andhra Pradesh continued the scheme even after the central government backed out from paying 50 percent of the premium from April, 2020. The second phase of YSR Bima was launched on 1 July 2021 where 750 crore rupees were disbursed to provide insurance premiums to 1.32 crore families of below poverty line. Under the scheme, the total amount of 1307 crores was spent during the first two years. Families of 12,039 beneficiaries were covered under the scheme though they have died before completing the registration process.

The scheme 
YSR Bima is eligible to all the primary unorganized workers aged from 18 to 70 of the families belonging to below poverty line. Insurance amount of ₹5 Lakh is deposited to the families of workers aged 18–50 in case of accidental death or total permanent disability and ₹3 Lakh for the families of people aged between 51 and 70 years.

Insurance amount of ₹1 Lakh would be paid if the breadwinner of the family aged between 18 and 50 dies naturally.

References 

Social security in India
Andhra Pradesh
Year of establishment missing
Government welfare schemes in Andhra Pradesh